Alice McDermott (born June 27, 1953) is an American writer and university professor. For her 1998 novel Charming Billy she won an American Book Award and the U.S. National Book Award for Fiction.

McDermott is Johns Hopkins University's Richard A. Macksey Professor of the Humanities.

Life

McDermott was born in Brooklyn, New York. She attended St. Boniface School in Elmont, New York, on Long Island (1967), Sacred Heart Academy in Hempstead (1971), and the State University of New York at Oswego, receiving her BA in 1975, and received her MA from the University of New Hampshire in 1978.

She has taught at UCSD and American University, has been a writer-in-residence at Lynchburg College and Hollins College in Virginia, and was lecturer in English at the University of New Hampshire. Ms. McDermott is currently the Richard A. Macksey Professor of the Humanities at Johns Hopkins University. Her short stories have appeared in Ms., Redbook, Mademoiselle, The New Yorker and Seventeen. She has also published articles in The New York Times and The Washington Post.

Ms. McDermott lives outside Washington, D.C. with her husband, a neuroscientist, and three children. She is Catholic, though she once deemed herself "not a very good Catholic."

Awards and honors

 That Night (1987) — finalist for the National Book Award, the PEN/Faulkner Award for Fiction, and the Pulitzer Prize
 At Weddings and Wakes (1992) — finalist for the Pulitzer Prize
 Charming Billy (1998) — winner of an American Book Award (1999) and the National Book Award
 Child of My Heart : A Novel (2002) — nominated for the International Dublin Literary Award
 After This (2006) — finalist for the Pulitzer Prize
 Someone (2013) - longlisted for the 2013 National Book Award Fiction
1987 Whiting Award
 In 2010 she received the  Fitzgerald Award for Achievement in American Literature award which is given annually in Rockville Maryland, the city where Fitzgerald, his wife, and his daughter are buried as part of the F. Scott Fitzgerald Literary Festival.  
2013 Inducted into the New York Writers Hall of Fame. 
2014 National Book Critics Circle Award fiction shortlist for Someone
2014 Finalist for Dayton Literary Peace Prize.
2018 Prix Femina étranger for La Neuvième Heure, translation of The Ninth Hour

Bibliography

Novels
 
 ; reprint 21 February 2005
 ; reprint 24 November 2009
 ; reprint 24 November 2009
 Child of My Heart, Farrar, Straus and Giroux, 2002; 2013, 
 ; reprint 25 September 2007
 
 The Ninth Hour: A Novel. Farrar, Straus and Giroux. 19 September 2017. .

Essays

What About the Baby? Farrar, Straus, and Giroux. 17 August 2021. .

Notes

External links
Alice McDermott's official website
 
 After This Reviews at Metacritic
 Publisher's bio of Alice McDermott at BookBrowse.com
 Alice McDermott at Library of Congress Authorities — with 14 catalog records
 Whiting Foundation Profile
 Alice McDermott, The Art of Fiction No. 244, Paris Review, Fall 2019

1953 births
Living people
20th-century American novelists
20th-century American women writers
21st-century American novelists
21st-century American women writers
American Book Award winners
American women novelists
Catholics from New York (state)
Johns Hopkins University faculty
National Book Award winners
Novelists from Maryland
Novelists from New York (state)
PEN/Faulkner Award for Fiction winners
People from Elmont, New York
People from Hempstead (town), New York
Place of birth missing (living people)
State University of New York at Oswego alumni
The New Yorker people
Writers from Brooklyn
Prix Femina Étranger winners
American women academics